Joseph Gomer may refer to:
 Joseph Gomer (missionary) (1834–1892), African American missionary
 Joseph Gomer (pilot) (1920–2013), African-American pilot